Lee Sang-hoon (Hangul: 이상훈, Hanja: 李尙勳; ; born March 11, 1971), nicknamed "Samson" for his long hair, is a retired professional baseball player who played in Major League Baseball, Nippon Professional Baseball, and the KBO League. 

Lee graduated from Korea University in 1993, and after graduation he joined the LG Twins. Beginning his career as a starting pitcher, his best two years were 1994 and 1995, when he won 18 and 20 games, respectively. His record of 20-5 with a 2.01 ERA, 12 complete games, and 142 strikeouts in 1995 earned him a KBO League Golden Glove Award.

He converted to a closer following the 1995 season.

Lee was posted in 1998, but became the first player whose Korean team rejected the bid for the right to negotiate with him. Lee eventually did make it to the Major Leagues, pitching in nine games for the Boston Red Sox in the 2000 MLB season, recording no decisions and a 3.09 ERA in 11.2 innings pitched.

Lee was at one time the highest-paid player in the KBO after he signed a 600-million-won contract in his second stint with the LG Twins in 2003. 

Since his retirement, he has coached in the KBO Futures League and the KBO.

References

External links 

Career statistics and player information from Korea Baseball Organization
Lee Sang-hoon Fancafe at Daum 

Boston Red Sox players
Chunichi Dragons players
SSG Landers players
LG Twins players
Major League Baseball pitchers
KBO League pitchers
Major League Baseball players from South Korea
South Korean expatriate baseball players in the United States
South Korean expatriate baseball players in Japan
Korea University alumni
Seoul High School alumni
1971 births
Living people
Asian Games medalists in baseball
Baseball players at the 2002 Asian Games
Asian Games gold medalists for South Korea
LG Twins coaches
Doosan Bears coaches
South Korean rock singers
Baseball players from Seoul
Medalists at the 2002 Asian Games
21st-century South Korean singers
Pawtucket Red Sox players